Luigi Lucherini (6 January 1930 – 9 August 2022) was an Italian politician and engineer.

He was member of the Forza Italia party. He has served as Mayor of Arezzo from 1999 to 2006.

He was elected for the first time as mayor of Arezzo in 1999. He was sentenced at first instance to two years for abuse of office in 2008.

Biography
Lucherini was born in Arezzo, Italy in 1930. He has two sons. He was President of the National Union of Italian freelance engineers from 1986 to 1995. He graduated in engineering in Pisa in 1956.

See also
 List of mayors of Arezzo

References 

1930 births
2022 deaths
People from Arezzo
Forza Italia politicians
21st-century Italian politicians
20th-century Italian politicians
Mayors of Arezzo
University of Pisa alumni